Drive-by inspection is a quick assessment of a property. Drive-by inspection, or quick property assessment of properties are performed to assess a real estate property, such as of by field investigators for out-of-town landlords of rental property. Drive-by inspection services are primarily used by financial institutions in the case of foreclosure and require foreclosure property preservation and bank foreclosure inspection services and specialists.

Foreclosure 
Drive-by inspection process includes:
 Property assessment, upgrades and improvements – the property is inspected by a professional which inspects based upon a report verifying that all given financial funds and resources where utilized solely for home improvement.
 Investigation and verification – is done to confirmed the property address, determine neighborhood condition and value of properties, and capture a photographic record of property interior and exterior.
 Legalization
 Implementation of methods and procedures are enforced by:
Fair Debt Collection Practices Act
Fair Credit Reporting Act
Health Insurance Portability and Accountability Act

References 

Mortgage